Leonard I. Linkow (February 25, 1926 – January 26, 2017) was an American dentist and pioneer in the field of oral implantology. In 1969, he was nominated for a Nobel Prize in medicine, making him the only dentist to be nominated for the prize. Linkow held 36 patents in dental science.

Early life and education
Linkow was born in Brooklyn, New York, on February 25, 1926. He played baseball in high school and was signed to contract by the New York Giants to play for their minor league affiliate in Springfield, Ohio.

He worked as a radio operator in the U.S. Army Air Force during World War II.

Turning down a career in professional baseball, he attended New York University's College of Dentistry, graduating in 1952.

Career
Linkow placed his first dental implant in 1952. In his New York City dental practice, he placed and equipped over 100,000 oral implants.

His innovations in oral implantology included various designs of blade implants (implants placed with cortical support), the self-tapping ventplant, root form implants, the tripodal subperiosteal implant. All modern designs of 2-stage (2-piece) implants (except lateral-basal and screwable basal implants: implants placed in cortical anchorage) go back to Linkow's inventions. Linkow worked in immediate functional loading protocols (with machined implants) long before specific implant surfaces were introduced into the profession. Hence he considered such surfaces as "not necessary" for his work.

Linkow served as the president of the American Academy of Implant Dentistry in 1974 and president of the American Board of Oral Implantology in 1993. He co-founded the American Society of Dental Esthetics along with Irwin Smigel.

In addition to lecturing internationally, Linkow also authored 18 books and about 200 journal articles.

Linkow was clinical professor at New York University, Temple University in Pennsylvania, the University of Pittsburgh, and Lille University in France.

Death
Linkow died on January 26, 2017, at the age of 90.

Awards and honors
Lifetime Achievement Award from the AAID, 2015
Honored Fellow of the American Academy of Implant Dentistry
Isaih Lew Memorial Research Award, 1990
Aaron Gershkoff/Norman Goldberg Award, 1974

Select bibliography
Implant Dentistry Today
 Maxillary Implants (1977)
Mandibular Implants (1977)
Theories and Techniques of Oral Implantology (vol.1) (1970)
Theories and Techniques of Oral Implantology (vol.2) (1970)

Legacy
Three institutes are named after Linkow: the Linkow International Institute of Oral Implantology in Bari, Italy; the Linkow International Institute of Oral Implantology in St. Petersburg, Russia; and Linkow Implant Institute-Caribbean in Kingston, Jamaica.

External links
The Dr. Leonard I. Linkow Library
Leonard I. Linkow, American Academy of Implant Prosthodontics

References

1926 births
2017 deaths
American dentists
American dentistry academics
Dentistry education
New York University College of Dentistry alumni
People from Brooklyn
20th-century dentists